is a Japanese golfer. She was the leading money winner on the JLPGA Tour six times in a row from 2000 to 2005. She became the first player on the JLPGA Tour to earn in excess of 100 million yen, a feat she accomplished in 2000, and achieved again in 2003, 2004 and 2005.

In 2003, Fudoh became the first player to win 10 tournaments in a year and she earned more prize money than the leading male player on the Japan Golf Tour. In 2004 Fudoh became the youngest player to earn permanent seeding on the Tour following her 30th career victory at the Golf 5 Ladies Open. In 2005 Fudoh became the first JLPGA Player to earn in excess of 800 million yen.

In 2005, she topped the money list for the sixth consecutive year following her second-place finish at the Ricoh JLPGA Tour Championship. In 2006, she became the youngest player on the JLPGA Tour to win 40 tournaments following her win at the Life Card Ladies Open. In 2008, she became the first player on the JLPGA Tour to break the billion-yen barrier in career winnings with her victory in the Meiji Chocolate Cup, and also took the lead at Sunningdale in the Women's British Open.

Fudoh has stated that her primary goal is to compete in Japan and she has no interest competing on the U.S. LPGA Tour full-time apart from the majors. She was fourth on the debut edition of the Women's World Golf Rankings, released in February 2006.

She currently has endorsement deals with Titleist, Ellesse and Nomura Asset Management

LPGA of Japan Tour wins (50)

Tournaments in bold denotes major tournaments in LPGA of Japan Tour.

Results in LPGA majors

DNP = did not play
DNS = did not start
CUT = missed the half-way cut
"T" tied
Green background for a win. Yellow background for a top-10 finish.

Summary
Starts – 20
Wins – 0
2nd-place finishes – 0
3rd-place finishes – 1
Top 3 finishes – 1
Top 5 finishes – 1
Top 10 finishes – 1
Top 25 finishes – 6
Missed cuts – 6
Most consecutive cuts made – 10
Longest streak of top-10s – 1

LPGA Tour of Japan summary

Source:

References

External links

Profile on Yahoo! Sports

Japanese female golfers
LPGA of Japan Tour golfers
People from Kumamoto
1976 births
Living people